Juan Pablo Fassi Álvarez (born August 16, 1994, in Cuauhtémoc, Mexico) is a retired professional Mexican footballer who currently is the sporting director of Talleres de Córdoba.

Career
In the summer 2019, at the age of only 24, it was confirmed and announced, that Fassi had been appointed sporting director of Argentina club, Talleres de Córdoba, the club owned by his father, Andrés Fassi.

References

External links
 

1994 births
Living people
Footballers from Mexico City
Mexican footballers
Club Puebla players
Centro Atlético Fénix players
Liga Premier de México players
Tercera División de México players
Mexican expatriate footballers
Expatriate footballers in Uruguay
Mexican expatriate sportspeople in Uruguay
Association football midfielders
Mexican people of Argentine descent
Sportspeople of Argentine descent